Jackson is a manufacturer of electric guitars and electric bass guitars that bears the name of its founder, Grover Jackson. The company was acquired by the Fender Musical Instruments Corporation in 2002, which manufactures Jackson-branded guitars in its Corona, California, US and Ensenada, Mexico facilities. Low-priced "budget" models are produced by sub-contractors in Indonesia and China.

History

Early years

Grover Jackson obtained part ownership in Charvel's Guitar Repair of Glendora, California in the 1970s. Wayne Charvel eventually filed bankruptcy and sold his interest to Grover Jackson on November 10, 1978, which gave Jackson control of the Charvel name.

Jackson Guitars originated in 1980 when guitarist Randy Rhoads approached the company with an idea for an individualized guitar. The collaborative design effort between Rhoads, Grover Jackson, Tim Wilson, and Jackson's masterbuilder, Mike Shannon, resulted in the creation of the Concorde, an innovative revamp of the traditional Flying V. These designs were such a departure from Charvel's Stratocaster-based models that Jackson elected to label them under a different brand name. He chose his own last name, and created the first Jackson guitar.

Throughout the heavy metal heyday of the 1980s, the Jackson brand was associated with high-quality, American-made, custom instruments, and was used by many popular guitarists of the period. In addition to the original, as they came to be known, Rhoads models, the 1980s spawned distinctively designed Jackson models such as the Soloist, King V, Kelly, and the Dinky, all of which remain icons of the brand.

1990s–present
The 1990s brought changes in musical trends. While still making the high-end American-made products, brands like Jackson began producing inexpensive, Asian-made versions of their staple designs in an effort to make their products more accessible to lower-end buyers.

In the Fall of 2002, Fender Musical Instruments Corporation purchased Jackson from IMC, the company which had bought Jackson from Grover Jackson, and U.S. operations were moved to the Fender factory in Corona. Present day Fender-era Jackson and Charvel guitars are produced at Corona and Fender's Ensenada facility. Low-priced "budget" models are produced by sub-contractors based in Indonesia and China.

After several years of running a successful company doing sub-contracting work for many well known guitar companies and extensive design consultancy, Grover Jackson is now co-owner of a new guitar brand, GJ2 Guitars, in Orange County, California. His partner in this venture is former Fender Senior Vice President Jon Gold.

Design hallmarks 

From the earliest beginnings until the present day, Jackson Guitars is known for its slender, elegant designs, and feature aggressive motifs that are popular with hard rock and metal musicians.

Traditionally, Jackson (and many Charvel) guitars share the typical pointed headstock that first appeared on Randy Rhoads's prototype in 1980. This likely arose from trade dress infringement issues as a result of Charvel's use of Fender Stratocaster shaped headstocks until the early 1980s. Fender's 2002 acquisition of both the Jackson and Charvel brands has enabled the Strat-style headstock to be reintroduced (under license).

Another Jackson trademark is the 'shark fin' inlays, which inspired other famous guitar companies such as Ibanez to follow suit with similar designs.

Jackson 2021 guitar models: Concert Bass, Demmelition Fury, Dinky, Dominion, Juggernaut, Kelly, Kelly Bird, King V, MF 1, Monarkh, PC 1, Rhoads, San Dimas, Shadowcaster, Soloist, Spectra Bass, Star, Warrior.

References

External links 

 

Companies based in Scottsdale, Arizona
Guitar manufacturing companies of the United States
Guitar pickup manufacturers
Companies established in 1980
Fender Musical Instruments Corporation